William Phillips is a Canadian film director and screenwriter. After graduating from the University of Toronto with a bachelor of science, Phillips studied film at Ryerson University. Phillips then ran a film production company entitled Grandview Products and worked on the second-unit of the film Cube. After directing two short films, Milkman and Deep Cut, Phillips wrote and directed his first feature film in 2001, Treed Murray. The film earned five Genie Awards nominations including Best Motion Picture. Williams has since directed two more major Canadian films, Foolproof and Gunless.

Selected filmography
Milkman (1997, short film)
Deep Cut (1998, short film)
Treed Murray (2001)
Foolproof (2003)
Gunless (2010)

References

External links

Living people
Canadian film directors
Canadian male screenwriters
University of Toronto alumni
Toronto Metropolitan University alumni
Year of birth missing (living people)
Place of birth missing (living people)
20th-century Canadian male writers
21st-century Canadian male writers
20th-century Canadian screenwriters
21st-century Canadian screenwriters